Parapoynx tullialis is a moth in the family Crambidae. It was described by Francis Walker in 1859. It is found in Australia, where it has been recorded from the Australian Capital Territory.

References

Acentropinae
Moths described in 1859